Mervyn Armstrong, OBE (1906 – 1984) was an eminent Anglican clergyman during the middle third of the 20th century.

Educated at Balliol College, Oxford, he was ordained in 1938. His first posts were as a Chaplain in the RNVR, after which he was Vicar of Margate. Appointed Chaplain to the Archbishop of Canterbury in 1949 he became Archdeacon of Stow and then Provost of Leicester Cathedral before appointment to the episcopate as Bishop of Jarrow in 1958. In 1964, he resigned that See to become an "advisor on industry" to Donald Coggan, Archbishop of York, and an Assistant Bishop of York; he retired in 1970.

References

1906 births
1984 deaths
Alumni of Balliol College, Oxford
Royal Naval Volunteer Reserve personnel of World War II
Archdeacons of Stow
Provosts and Deans of Leicester
Bishops of Jarrow
20th-century Church of England bishops
Officers of the Order of the British Empire
Royal Navy chaplains